An Interpenetrating polymer network (IPN) is a polymer comprising two or more networks which are at least partially interlaced on a polymer scale but not covalently bonded to each other. The network cannot be separated unless chemical bonds are broken.
The two or more networks can be envisioned to be entangled in such a way that they are concatenated and cannot be pulled apart, but not bonded to each other by any chemical bond.

Simply mixing two or more polymers does not create an interpenetrating polymer network (polymer blend), nor does creating a polymer network out of more than one kind of monomers which are bonded to each other to form one network (heteropolymer or copolymer).

There are semi-interpenetrating polymer networks (SIPN) and pseudo-interpenetrating polymer networks.

To prepare IPNs and SIPNs, the different components are formed simultaneously or sequentially.

History 
The first known IPN was a combination of phenol-formaldehyde resin with vulcanized natural rubber made by Jonas Aylsworth in 1914. However, this was before Staudinger's hypothesis on macromolecules and thus the terms "polymer" or "IPN" were not yet used. The first usage of the term "interpenetrating polymer networks" was first introduced by J.R. Millar in 1960 while discussing networks of sulfonated and unsulfonated styrene–divinylbenzene copolymers.

Mechanical Properties 
Molecular intermixing tends to broaden the glass transition regions of some IPN materials compared to their component polymers. This unique characteristic provides excellent mechanical damping properties over a wide range of temperatures and frequencies due to a relatively constant and high phase angle. In IPNs composed of both rubbery and glassy polymers, considerable toughening is observed compared to the constituent polymers. When the glassy component forms a discrete, discontinuous phase, the elastomeric nature of the continuous rubbery phase can be preserved while increasing the overall toughness of the material and its elongation at break. On the other hand, when the glassy polymer forms a bicontinuous phase within the rubbery network, the IPN material can behave like an impact-resistant plastic.

Morphology 
Most IPNs do not interpenetrate completely on a molecular scale, but rather form small dispersed or bicontinuous phase morphologies with characteristic length scales on the order of tens of nanometers. However, since these length scales are relatively small, they are often considered homogeneous on a macroscopic scale. The characteristic lengths associated with these domains often scale with the length of chains between crosslinks, and thus the morphology of the phases is often dictated by the crosslinking density of the constituent networks. The kinetics of phase separation in IPNs can arise from both nucleation and growth and spinodal decomposition mechanisms, with the former producing discrete phases akin to dispersed spheres and the latter forming bicontinuous phases akin to interconnected cylinders. Contrary to many typical phase separation processes, coarsening, where the length scale of the phases tends to increase over time, can be impeded by the formation of crosslinks in either network. Furthermore, IPNs are often able to maintain these complex morphologies over long periods of time compared to what could be achieved by simple polymer blends.

Applications 
IPNs have been used in automotive parts (including modern automotive paint), damping materials, medical devices, molding compounds, and in engineering plastics. While many benefits come from the enhanced mechanical properties of the IPN materials, other characteristics such as resistance to solvent swelling can also make IPNs a material of commercial interest. More recent applications and areas of research for IPNs include uses in drug delivery systems, energy storage materials, and tissue engineering.

References

Polymer chemistry
Networks